Vietnam: The Camera at War is a television documentary originally broadcast on BBC2 in 1995 as a special edition of the arts strand The Late Show marking the 20th anniversary of the end of the Vietnam War. It tells the story of the war through its most iconic photographs (such as The Burning Monk and The Napalm Girl, etc.)

The documentary is produced and directed by David Upshal.

It is notable stylistically for telling the story without commentary or moving images. The entire story is told with only still photographs and the voices of the photographers who took them.

Contributors include Tim Page, Don McCullin, Nick Ut, Philip Jones Griffiths, Malcolm Browne, Eddie Adams, David Burnett and Wallace Terry.

1995 television films
1995 films
British television films
Television series about the history of Vietnam
BBC television documentaries about history during the 20th Century
1990s British films